Karllangia arenicola is a species of marine copepod. It is the type species of the Genus Karllangia. 
The species was described by Noodt in 1964.

References

Harpacticoida